Andrzej Fidyk (born in 1953, Warsaw) is a  Polish documentary filmmaker, producer, and professor of the Krzysztof Kieślowski Film School in Katowice. He is best known for work his 1989 documentary Defilada (The Parade), which depicts the mass parades choreographed to celebrate the fortieth anniversary of the Democratic People's Republic of Korea (North Korea) in 1988.

Initially, Fidyk planned to be an economist.  During 1972 and 1977 he studied foreign trade at
the Central School of Planning and Statistics at the Warsaw School of Economics. After graduation, he worked at the Foreign
Trade Bureau for two years, work which he hated 

He first started working for television in 1980, since when he has made over 40 documentary films shown primarily on Polish and British television. From 1991 to 1996 he worked for the BBC in the Music and Arts Department.  Between 1996 and 2004 he was Head of Documentaries at Polish Television.

Filmography
1982
 Idzie Grześ przez wieś, production, script,
1983
 Optymistyczny film o niewidomych, director,
1984
 Ich teatr,  director, script,
1985
 Prezydent,  director,
1986
 Noc w pałacu,  director, script,
 Praga,  director, script,
1987
 Królewna Śnieżka, telefon i krowa,  director, script,
1988
 Paryż, miasto kontrastów,  director, script,
1989
 Defilada,  production, script,
1990
 Ostatki, script, production
1993
 Sen Staszka w Teheranie,  director, script,
1994
 Niebo oplutych,  production,
 Pocztówka z Japonii,  production, script,
 The Russian Striptease,  director, production,
1995
 Carnaval. The Biggest Party In The World,  production, production,
 Ostatki,  production, script,
1997
 Ciężar nieważkości,  editing,
 Cross,  art consultation,
 Dziewczyny z Szymanowa,  production,
 East Of Eastenders,  director,
 Historia Jednej Butelki,  art consultation,
 Jeden dzień z życia Tomka Karata,  art consultation,
 Kanar,  production,
 El Porvenir de Una Ilusion,  production,
1998
 Dotknięci,  art consultation,
 Ganek,  production,
 Kiniarze z Kalkuty,  director, script, production,
 Marzenia i śmierć,  art consultation,
1999
 24 dni,  production,
 Oni,  editing,
 Takiego pięknego syna urodziłam,  art consultation,
 Twarzą w twarz z Papieżem,  editing,
 1989-1999 w dziesiątkę,  editing,
2000
 Jan Paweł II w Ziemi Świętej,  editing,
 Ziemia podwójnie obiecana. Jan Paweł II w Ziemi Świętej
 Ślub w Domu Samotności,  editing,
 Taniec trzcin,  production, script,
2001
 Prawdziwe psy (TV documentary/novel),  editing,
 Serce Z Węgla,  editing,
2002
 Bobrek Dance,  editing,
 Mój syn Romek,  editing,
 Przedszkolandia (TV documentary/novel), editing,
2003
 Imieniny,  art consultation,
2008
 Yodok Stories,  director i script,
2009
 Balcerowicz. Gra o wszystko, director, script.

2016

Lech Walesa, A Portrait, director.

References

1953 births
Living people
Polish film directors
Polish film producers
Film people from Warsaw